Martin Markus Pineda Steuble (born 9 June 1988) is a professional footballer who plays as a left back for Thai League 1 club Port. Born in Switzerland, he represents the Philippines national team.

Personal life
Steuble was born in Schlieren, Canton of Zürich, Switzerland. His mother is Filipino from Bacolod, Philippines.

Club career

Sporting Kansas City
As a free agent, Steuble joined Major League Soccer side Sporting Kansas City on 16 July 2014, after going through trials at the club.

Ceres-Negros FC
In January 2015, newly-promoted Ceres F.C. of United Football League signed Steuble as addition to the line-up for the 2014–15 PFF National Men's Club Championship.

He continued to play for Ceres when the club joined the Philippines Football League.

International career
In October 2013, Steuble confirmed he would join the Philippines national team and traveled to Manila to settle his eligibility requirements. He made his international debut on 1 March 2014 when he started in a friendly match against Malaysia that ended in a 0–0 draw.  In his third cap, he scored his first international goal in a 3–0 win over Nepal on 11 April 2014.

International goals
Scores and results list the Philippines' goal tally first.

Honours

Club
Lausanne-Sport
 Swiss Challenge League (1): 2010–11
Ceres-Negros
 Philippines Football League (2): 2017, 2018
 United Football League (1): 2015
 United Football League Cup runner-up (2): 2015, 2016
Port
 Thai FA Cup (1): 2019

Notes

References

External links
 Official Website of Martin Steuble 
 
 
 

1988 births
Living people
People from Schlieren, Switzerland
Swiss people of Filipino descent
Citizens of the Philippines through descent
Filipino people of Swiss descent
Swiss men's footballers
Filipino footballers
Swiss expatriate footballers
Filipino expatriate footballers
Philippines international footballers
Association football midfielders
Grasshopper Club Zürich players
Neuchâtel Xamax FCS players
FC Lausanne-Sport players
FC Wohlen players
FC Wil players
Sporting Kansas City players
Martin Steuble
Expatriate soccer players in the United States
Swiss expatriate sportspeople in Thailand
Filipino expatriate sportspeople in Thailand
Expatriate footballers in Thailand
Major League Soccer players
Ceres–Negros F.C. players
Swiss Super League players
Swiss Challenge League players
Martin Steuble
Sportspeople from the canton of Zürich